Phowa is a dialect cluster of Loloish languages spoken by the Phula people of China. There are three principal varieties, Hlepho, Ani, and Labo, which may be considered distinct languages. Hlepho may be closer to Phukha than it is to Labo and Ani. Usage is decreasing, with about two-thirds of Phowa speaking their language.

The representative Hlepho Phowa dialect studied in Pelkey (2011) is that of Feizuke 菲租克, Xinhua Township 新华乡, Pingbian County.

References

Loloish languages